Kaji Pratha is the honorary hereditary practice that originated from medieval period in Nepal.  

Ganesh Pande was the first Kaji under King Dravya Shah of Gorkha Kingdom. He helped Dravya Shah to become King of Gorkha and was later appointed Kaji of Gorkha in 1559 A.D. Another significant Kaji of Gorkha was Kalu Pande born in the family of Ganesh Pande. He was son of Bhimraj Pande who was also a Kaji during the reign of King Nara Bhupal Shah.

Notes

References

Bibliography 

Caste system in Nepal
Social history of Nepal